Strombolicchio Lighthouse is an active lighthouse placed on the summit of Strombolicchio, a sea stack  to the north-east of Stromboli in the Aeolian Islands.

Description
It is completely automated, solar powered, and is operated by the Marina Militare; its identification code number is 3310 E.F.

See also
 List of lighthouses in Italy

References

External links
 Servizio Fari Marina Militare

Lighthouses in Italy
Lighthouses completed in 1925
Aeolian Islands